Fukazawa (written: 深澤) is a Japanese surname. Notable people with the surname include:

Masahiro Fukazawa, Japanese sportsperson
Shichirō Fukazawa, Japanese writer
Masao Fukazawa, Japanese actor
, Japanese speed skater

Japanese-language surnames